Elachista cirrhoplica is a moth of the family Elachistidae first described by Lauri Kaila in 2012. It is found in eastern Spain. The habitat consists of montane areas at altitudes between 1,600 and 2,300 meters.

The wingspan is 8.8–9.5 mm. The forewing ground colour is white, scattered with black scales and with three indistinct yellow longitudinal lines. The basal third of the costa is black and the fringe scales concolorous with the forewing, although some of the longer scales distally are brown or dark grey, forming an indistinct double fringe line. The hindwings are pale grey with concolorous fringe scales.

References

cirrhoplica
Moths described in 2012
Moths of Europe